John B. Healy (26 May 1903 – 9 January 1995) was an Irish Fianna Fáil politician who served as a Teachta Dála (TD) for the Kerry South constituency from 1943 to 1948.

A solicitor by profession, he was elected at the 1943 general election for Kerry South. He was re-elected at the 1944 general election, but was defeated at the 1948 general election.

References

1995 deaths
Fianna Fáil TDs
Members of the 11th Dáil
Members of the 12th Dáil
Politicians from County Kerry
Irish solicitors
1903 births